The Jerusalem Prize for the Freedom of the Individual in Society is a biennial literary award given to writers whose works have dealt with themes of human freedom in society.

It is awarded at the Jerusalem International Book Forum (previously known as the Jerusalem International Book Fair), and the recipient usually delivers an address when accepting the award. The award is valued at $10,000.

The prize's inaugural year was 1963, awarded to Bertrand Russell who had won the Nobel Prize in 1950. Octavio Paz, V. S. Naipaul, J. M. Coetzee and Mario Vargas Llosa all won the Jerusalem Prize prior to winning the Nobel.

In the intervening even-numbered years there is also a National Jerusalem Prize to promote local Israeli authors. For example, in 1994 the Jerusalem Prize was won by Naomi Gal.

List of laureates

References

External links
Jerusalem Prize at the Jerusalem International Book Forum

Awards established in 1963
1963 establishments in Israel
Israeli literary awards
International literary awards
Literary awards honouring human rights
Literary awards honoring lifetime achievement
Israeli human rights awards
Culture of Jerusalem